Barf-O-Rama is a series of children's novellas by Pat Pollari, the pseudonym of the popular children's author K.A. Applegate (who also wrote the Animorphs series). The stories were humorous, with a strong emphasis on scatological humor and other generally repulsive themes. The humor contained in the series is similar to that of Sylvia Branzei's Grossology series or the Slimeballs trilogy, by U.B. Gross. Because of the limited availability of many of the books in the series and their relative obscurity, most of them are out of print and very difficult to obtain.

Complete List
 Great Puke-Off, The	
 Legend of Big Fart, The	
 Mucus Mansion	
 Garbage Time	
 Dog Doo Afternoon	
 To Wee or Not to Wee	
 Scab Pie	
 Party Pooper	
 Pig Breath	
 My Runny Valenslime	
 Splat in the Hat, The	
 Jurassic Fart	
 Shoe Chew	
 Forest Dump	
 Hambooger and French Flies	
 Fungus Among Us	
 Spoiled Rotten

Sources
 http://www.metroactive.com/papers/sonoma/02.13.97/bk-gross-9707.html

Series of children's books
Novels by K. A. Applegate
Children's novellas